Statistics of Empress's Cup in the 1998 season.

Overview
It was contested by 20 teams, and Prima Ham FC Kunoichi won the championship.

Results

1st round
Yokosuka Seagulls FC 1-2 YKK Tohoku LSC Flappers
Sapporo Linda 1-7 Matsushita Electric Panasonic Ragazza
OKI FC Winds 2-0 Shimizudaihachi SC
Scramble FC 0-5 Fujita SC Mercury

2nd round
Suzuyo Shimizu FC Lovely Ladies 11-0 Toyama Ladies SC
YKK Tohoku LSC Flappers 0-4 Takarazuka Bunnys
Prima Ham FC Kunoichi 7-1 Matsushita Electric Panasonic Ragazza
Fukuoka First Lady Eleven 0-16 Matsushita Electric Panasonic Bambina
Tasaki Perule FC 4-0 Nippon Sport Science University
OKI FC Winds 1-5 Yomiuri Beleza
Nikko Securities Dream Ladies 1-0 Fujita SC Mercury
Socius Amigo 0-6 Shiroki FC Serena

Quarterfinals
Nikko Securities Dream Ladies 3-0 Shiroki FC Serena
Suzuyo Shimizu FC Lovely Ladies 3-1 Takarazuka Bunnys
Prima Ham FC Kunoichi 3-0 Matsushita Electric Panasonic Bambina
Tasaki Perule FC 2-1 Yomiuri Beleza

Semifinals
Nikko Securities Dream Ladies 1-1 (pen 4-1) Suzuyo Shimizu FC Lovely Ladies
Prima Ham FC Kunoichi 2-0 Tasaki Perule FC

Final
Nikko Securities Dream Ladies 0-1 Prima Ham FC Kunoichi
Prima Ham FC Kunoichi won the championship.

References

Empress's Cup
1998 in Japanese women's football